Harry Smart (born 1956) is a British poet.

He was born in Yorkshire and lives in Montrose, Scotland.
He has had three poetry collections published by Faber and Faber:

Shoah (May 1993)
Pierrot
Fool's Pardon (July 1995)

He has also written a novel, called Zaire.

References

External links
Author's website
At Warwick University

Living people
British poets
1956 births
British male poets